Soldier Creek is a  long second-order tributary to the Niobrara River in Knox County, Nebraska.

Course
Soldier Creek rises on the North Branch Verdigre Creek divide about 4 miles southeast of Knoxville, Nebraska and then flows northeast to join the Niobrara River about 3 miles southeast of Pishelville, Nebraska.

Watershed
Soldier Creek drains  of area, receives about 24.8 in/year of precipitation, has a wetness index of 463.77, and is about 6.36% forested.

See also

List of rivers of Nebraska

References

Rivers of Knox County, Nebraska
Rivers of Nebraska